Jesenice is a town in Rakovník District in the Central Bohemian Region of the Czech Republic. It has about 1,600 inhabitants.

Administrative parts
Villages of Bedlno, Chotěšov, Kosobody, Podbořánky and Soseň are administrative parts of Jesenice.

History
The first written mention of Jesenice is from 1321. In 1409, it became a town. After it lost its town status after the World War II, it became a town once again in 2008.

References

External links

Populated places in Rakovník District
Cities and towns in the Czech Republic